2019 in professional wrestling describes the year's events in the world of professional wrestling.

List of notable promotions 
These promotions held notable shows in 2019.

Calendar of notable shows

January

February

March

April

May

June

July

August

September

October

November

December

Cancelled events

Notable events
April 10 – Dark Side of the Ring premiered on Viceland
May 1 – Impact Wrestling launched their online streaming service Impact Plus
September 18 – WWE NXT premiered on USA Network
October 2 – AEW Dynamite premiered on TNT
October 4 – WWE SmackDown premiered on FOX
October 8 – AEW Dark premiered on YouTube
October 8 – NWA Power premiered on YouTube, Facebook, and FITE TV
October 29 – Impact! premiered on AXS TV
October 31 – At WWE's Crown Jewel pay-per-view, the first women's match was contested in Saudi Arabia between Natalya and Lacey Evans
November 5 – WWE Backstage premiered on Fox Sports 1

Accomplishments and tournaments

AAA

AEW

CMLL

Impact

MLW

NJPW

NWA

WWE

Title changes

AEW

CMLL

Impact Wrestling

IWRG

Lucha Libre AAA Worldwide

MLW

NJPW

NWA

ROH

The Crash Lucha Libre

WWE
 – Raw
 – SmackDown
 – 205 Live
 – NXT
 – NXT UK
 – Unbranded

Raw, SmackDown, and 205 Live
Raw and SmackDown each had a world championship, a secondary championship, a women's championship, and a male tag team championship, while 205 Live just had one title for their cruiserweight wrestlers.

NXT

NXT UK

Unbranded
These titles are not brand exclusive. The colors indicate the home brand of the champions (names without a color are former WWE wrestlers, Hall of Famers, or non-wrestlers).

Awards and honors

AAA

AAA Hall of Fame

WWE

WWE Hall of Fame

Debuts

 January 2
 Atsuki Aoyagi
 Dan Tamura
 January 4 – Unagi Sayaka
 March 10 – Haruka Umesaki
 April 10 – Strong Machine J
 April 16 – Jacky Kamei
 April 30 – Momo Kohgo
 May 3 – Mirai
 May 7 – Maika
 July 8 – Tomoka Inaba
 August 3 – Cain Velasquez
 August 10 – Saya Kamitani
 August 17 – Yuki Mashiro
 August 31 – Teal Piper
 September 24 – Hayato Tamura
 October 6 – Nanami
 October 18 – Keigo Nakamura
 November 2 – Action Andretti
 November 7 – Odyssey Jones
 December 22 – SB Kento

Retirements 

January 30 - Abyss (wrestler) (1995-2019)
 February 21 – Takashi Iizuka (1986–2019)
 March 9 – Mil Máscaras (1963–2019) 
 March 11 – Brie Bella (September 15, 2007–2019)
 March 19 – Matt Morgan (2002–March 19, 2019) 
 March 24 – Nikki Bella (September 15, 2007–2019)
 April 6 – George Julio (1965–2019) 
 April 7 
 Kurt Angle (1998–2019)
 Batista (1999–2019)
April 21 – Command Bolshoi (1991–2019)
April 26 – Kris Wolf (2014–2019)
April 28 – Sawako Shimono (2010–2019)
May 11
Bob Armstrong (1961–2019) 
Wendell Cooley (1981–2019) 
 May 31 – Metálico
 June 26 – Riki Choshu (1974–June 26, 2019) 
 June 30 – Charlie Morgan (2011–2019)
 July – X-Pac (1989–July 2019, came out of retirement in 2022) 
 July 5 – Claude Roca (circa 1960s–July 5, 2019) 
 July 22 – Barbi Hayden (2010–2019) 
 August 3 – Dwayne Johnson (1996–2004, 2012-2019)
 August 10 – Koko B. Ware (1978–2019) 
 August 17 – Sergio El Hermoso (1960s–2019) 
 August 18 – Tinieblas (August 20, 1971–2019)
 September 15 – Jaque Mate (wrestler) (September 15, 1971–2019) 
 September 19 – Kim Duk (1968–2019, returned in 2022) 
 September 21 – Lisa Marie Varon (2000–2019)
 December 14 – Bill Dundee (1962–2019)

Deaths

 January 2 – "Mean" Gene Okerlund (b. 1942)
 January 5 – Alexis Smirnoff (b. 1947)
 January 22 – Belladonna (b.1979)
 February 1 – Les Thornton (b. 1934)
 February 10 – Kōji Kitao (b. 1963)
 February 9 – Salvatore Bellomo (b. 1951) 
 February 12 – Pedro Morales (b. 1942),
 March 4 – King Kong Bundy (b. 1957),
 March 7 – The Destroyer (b. 1930),
 March 18 – Roger Kirby (b. 1939),
 April 8 – Héctor del Mar (b. 1942),
 April 22 – John Quinn, (b. 1940),
 May 11 – Silver King, (b. 1968),
 May 16 – Ashley Massaro, (b. 1979),
 June 3 – Atsushi Aoki, (b. 1977),
 June 8 – Willie Williams (b. 1951) 
 June 19 – Lionheart, (b. 1982),
 July 2 – Jacques Rougeau Sr., (b. 1930),
 July 3 – Perro Aguayo, (b. 1946)
 July 6 – Paco Alonso, (b. 1952)
 August 1 – Harley Race, (b. 1943)
 August 14 – Gerry Hoggarth, (b. 1922) 
 August 15
Wrestling Pro, (b. 1938)
Eddie Marlin, (b. 1930) 
 August 22 – Norman Frederick Charles III (b. 1941) 
 August 26 – Dr. Karonte, (b. 1957)
 September 20 – Rick Bognar, (b. 1970)
 October 6 – Giant Gustav (b. 1961) 
 December 14 – Moondog Rex, (b. 1950)
 December 23 – Mr. Niebla, (b. 1973)
 December 28 – Izzy Slapawitz, (b. 1948)

See also
List of WWE pay-per-view and WWE Network events
List of AEW pay-per-view events
List of NWA pay-per-view events
List of NJPW pay-per-view events
List of ROH pay-per-view events
List of Impact Wrestling pay-per-view events
List of MLW events

References

 
professional wrestling